The Totowa Borough Public Schools are a comprehensive community public school district, serving students in pre-kindergarten through eighth grade in Totowa, in Passaic County, New Jersey, United States.

As of the 2018–19 school year, the district, comprising two schools, had an enrollment of 1,014 students and 78.0 classroom teachers (on an FTE basis), for a student–teacher ratio of 13.0:1.

The district is classified by the New Jersey Department of Education as being in District Factor Group "CD", the sixth-highest of eight groupings. District Factor Groups organize districts statewide to allow comparison by common socioeconomic characteristics of the local districts. From lowest socioeconomic status to highest, the categories are A, B, CD, DE, FG, GH, I and J.

For ninth through twelfth grades, public school students attend Passaic Valley Regional High School, which also serves students from Little Falls Township and Woodland Park (formerly West Paterson). The school facility is located in Little Falls Township. As of the 2018–19 school year, the high school had an enrollment of 1,186 students and 102.0 classroom teachers (on an FTE basis), for a student–teacher ratio of 11.6:1.

Schools
Schools in the district (with 2018–19 enrollment data from the National Center for Education Statistics) are:
Memorial School with 352 students in pre-kindergarten through second grade
Joseph Compel, Principal
Washington Park School with 626 students in grades three through eight
David Bower, Principal
Timothy Tracy, Vice Principal

Administration
Core members of the district's administration are:
Patricia Capitelli, Superintendent
Vincent W. Varcadipane, Business Administrator / Board Secretary

Board of education
The district's board of education, with nine members, sets policy and oversees the fiscal and educational operation of the district through its administration. As a Type II school district, the board's trustees are elected directly by voters to serve three-year terms of office on a staggered basis, with three seats up for election each year held as part of the April school election. As one of the 13 districts statewide with school elections in April, voters also decide on passage of the annual school budget.

References

External links
Totowa Public Schools website

School Data for the Totowa Borough Public Schools, National Center for Education Statistics
Passaic Valley Regional High School

Totowa, New Jersey
New Jersey District Factor Group CD
School districts in Passaic County, New Jersey